The Colorado Mammoth are a lacrosse team based in Denver, Colorado playing in the National Lacrosse League (NLL). The 2015 season is the 29th in franchise history and 13th as the Mammoth (previously the Washington Power, Pittsburgh Crossefire, and Baltimore Thunder).

Regular season

Final standings

Game log

Regular season

Playoffs

Roster

Transactions

Trades

Entry Draft
The 2014 NLL Entry Draft took place on September 22, 2014. The Mammoth made the following selections:

See also
2015 NLL season

References

Colorado
Colorado Mammoth seasons
Colorado Mammoth